David Tse is the Thomas Kailath and Guanghan Xu Professor of Engineering at Stanford University.

Education
Tse earned a B.S. in systems design engineering from University of Waterloo in 1989, an M.S. in electrical engineering from the Massachusetts Institute of Technology in 1991, and a Ph.D. in electrical engineering from MIT in 1994. As a postdoctoral student he was a staff member at AT&T Bell Laboratories.

Career
Tse's research at Stanford focuses on information theory and its applications in fields such as wireless communication, machine learning, energy and computational biology. He has designed assembly software to handle DNA and RNA sequencing data and was an inventor of the proportional-fair scheduling algorithm for cellular wireless systems. He received the 2017 Claude E. Shannon Award. In 2018, he was elected to the National Academy of Engineering.

Honors
 Early Faculty National Science Foundation CAREER Award, 1998
 Frederick Emmons Terman Award from the American Society for Engineering Education, 2009
 Fellow, IEEE, 2009
 Gilbreth Lectureship from the National Academy of Engineering, 2012
 Stephen O. Rice Prize in the Field of Communications Theory, 2013
 Claude E. Shannon Award, 2017
 Member, National Academy of Engineering, inducted 2018
 IEEE Richard W. Hamming Medal, 2019

Book
 Fundamentals of Wireless Communication (2005, Cambridge University Press) – with Pramod Viswanath

References

External links
 Personal homepage, Stanford University website
 Google Scholar page

Living people
Electrical engineering academics
Stanford University School of Engineering faculty
Stanford University Department of Electrical Engineering faculty
UC Berkeley College of Engineering faculty
Members of the United States National Academy of Engineering
Fellow Members of the IEEE
MIT School of Engineering alumni
University of Waterloo alumni
Hong Kong electrical engineers
Canadian electrical engineers
21st-century engineers
Year of birth missing (living people)